"Memories"  is a dance music song written by Fulvio Perniola, Gianni Bini, Marco Galeotti and Maurizio Tognarelli and originally recorded and released by the group Netzwerk in 1995. The song was a hit in dance clubs around the world.

Track listing
 Memories (Remix) - Italy 12 "Single

, Germany / Canada / Italy CD Maxi-single

Lil Suzy version
In 1997, Lil Suzy covered "Memories" for her fourth album Paradise. It was released as the second single from the album on November 11, 1997, and reached No. 5 on the Bubbling Under Hot 100 Singles chart.

Track listing
US 12" single

References

1995 singles
Lil Suzy songs
1997 singles